Kakani Katija is a bioengineer from Hawaii. While earning her Master's and PhD in Aeronautics and Bioengineering, Katija began to study the mechanics of swimming and feeding marine organisms.

Biography
Kakani Katija completed her bachelor's degree in Aeronautics and Astronautics at the University of Washington in 2004. She furthered her studies, earning a Master's in Aeronautics in 2005 at the California Institute of Technology (Caltech) and her Doctorate at Caltech in 2010 in Bioengineering.

Katija was awarded research fellowships from both the American Society for Engineering Education and the National Science Foundation to conduct graduate research. As a certified research diver, she has conducted field studies in various locations throughout the world, such as a study completed in 2009 off the coast of the Palau archipelago. The goal of this study was to understand the physics involved in the jellyfishes' movements. Instead, what they discovered was that the jellyfish not only push water into their bells, but drag an almost constant flume of water behind them. That discovery propelled Katija to study how much marine life contribute to mixing the ocean. Katija's discovery has led her to explore how much sea creatures mix fluid in the ocean at rates comparable to winds and tides. She was named an Emerging Explorer from the National Geographic Society in 2011 and as part of the award, a research dive in Panama was filmed in 2012 by National Geographic Society. In 2013, she was named a Kavli Research Fellow from the National Academy of Sciences and is currently working in Moss Landing, California at the Monterey Bay Aquarium Research Institute as a Postdoctoral Fellow. At the aquarium, she works on DeepPIV a research tool intended to make conducting experiments in ocean habitats less invasive and improve marine research techniques.

References 

American bioengineers
Living people
Scientists from Portland, Oregon
California Institute of Technology alumni
University of Washington College of Engineering alumni
21st-century American women scientists
Year of birth missing (living people)